Chatfield Island is an island in the North Coast region of the Canadian province of British Columbia. To its north and west is Yeo Island, to its east Cunningham Island. It was named in 1876 by the Hydrographic Office of the British Admiralty after Captain Alfred John Chatfield, RN (1831-1910). Its north coast was first charted in 1793 by George Vancouver, while its west coast was charted by one of his lieutenants, James Johnstone, later the same year.

References

Islands of British Columbia
North Coast of British Columbia